Brachythrips is a genus of thrips in the family Phlaeothripidae.

Species
 Brachythrips dirghavadana
 Brachythrips flavicornis

References

Phlaeothripidae
Thrips
Thrips genera